Pura Penataran Agung Lempuyang is a Balinese Hindu temple or pura located in the slope of Mount Lempuyang in Karangasem, Bali. Pura Penataran Agung Lempuyang is considered as part of a complex of pura surrounding Mount Lempuyang, one of the highly regarded temples of Bali. The temples of Mount Lempuyang, represented by the highest pura at the peak of Mount Lempuyang, Pura Lempuyang Luhur, is one of the Sad Kahyangan Jagad, or the "six sanctuaries of the world", the six holiest places of worship on Bali.

History
The establishment of places of worship around Mount Lempuyang is believed to predate the majority of Hindu temples on the island of Bali. The puras of Mount Lempuyang, represented by Pura Lempuyang Luhur, the highest temple in the area, is grouped one complex of pura which represents the Pura Sad Kahyangan Luhur Lempuyang. The temple groups are considered as part of the Sad Kahyangan Jagad, or the "six sanctuaries of the world", the six holiest places of worship on Bali. According to Balinese beliefs, they are the pivotal points of the island and are meant to provide spiritual balance to Bali. The temple groups of Mount Lempuyang is also one of the group of temples in Bali known as Pura Kahyangan Padma Bhuwana. Each of the temple in the Pura Kahyangan Padma Bhuwana marked each of the eight cardinal directions. Pura Lempuyang Luhur represents the direction of east (purwa) and the color white. This direction is associated with the domain of the Balinese god Iswara.

Pura Penataran Agung Lempuyang was restored in 2001.

Temple layout

Mount Lempuyang, also known as Mount Lempuyang Luhur, is one of the most sacred natural points in Bali. The whole Lempuyang mountain was divided into three section which corresponds to the Balinese cosmology, the base of the mountain is known as Sang Ananta Bhoga and corresponds to the mount of Brahma, the middle part of the mountain is known as Sang Naga Basukih and corresponds to mount of Vishnu, while the top of the mountain is known as Sang Naga Taksaka and is considered as mount of Shiva. The sacred-most point of Mount Lempuyang is where the Pura Lempuyang Luhur is built. Pura Penataran Agung, also known as Pura Silawana Hyang Sar, is located in the middle part of the mountain; while at the base of the mountain, the Pura Dalem Dasar Lempuyang is built.

Pura Penataran Agung Lempuyang is oriented toward the top of Mount Lempuyang. The temple compound is divided into three areas: the outer sanctum of the temple (jaba pisan or nistaning mandala), the middle sanctum (jaba tengah or madya mandala), and the inner main sanctum (jero or utamaning mandala).

Entrance to the outer sanctum (jaba pisan) is marked with a white-painted candi bentar split gate. Several bale (Balinese pavilions) are located in the outer sanctum, one of them is the rectangular bale gong ("gong pavilion") where the gamelans are stored. Another bale in this courtyard is the bale kulkul where the percussive drum to call for prayer is placed.

Entrance to the middle sanctum (jaba tengah) is marked with three white-painted paduraksa portals. The entrance to the left is used for entry, while the entrance to the right is used for exit. The central door is usually closed and is only opened during the pura's main festival e.g. the biannual piodalan festival. The central portal is where sacred objects, heirloom, and offerings could pass during festival time. All three flight of stairs which lead to the paduraksa portals is flanked with mythical figures of Naga. Sculptures inspired by the epic of Mahabharata, e.g. of Arjuna, Bima, and Yudhistira dots the landscape of the stair climb. On the uppermost level of these is the statue of Krishna, the worldly form of Vishnu.

The uppermost inner sanctum (jero) is the most sacred courtyard of the Balinese temple. The courtyard of Pura Penataran Agung Lempuyang features several meru towers and pelinggih shrines each dedicated to different gods and local deities. Several padmasana shrines in the shape of empty stone thrones, each are dedicated to the highest god of Hindu pantheon e.g. the Sang Hyang Widhi and the gods of the Trimurti.

Ritual
The piodalan or puja wali festival (pura's anniversary) of Pura Penataran Agung is held once every 6 months every Waraspati (Thursday) or one day after the Galungan festival.

See also

Balinese temple

References

Cited works

Balinese temples
Hindu temples in Indonesia